Matt Dwyer (born December 17, 1989) is a Canadian mixed martial artist currently competing in the Middleweight division. A professional competitor since 2011, he has competed for the UFC.

Mixed martial arts career
Dwyer made his professional debut in 2011 competing in regional promotions in his native British Columbia.  He compiled a record of 7 - 1, finishing all of his opponents, including notable fighters Shonie Carter and DaMarques Johnson by KO/TKO before signing with the UFC in the summer of 2014.

Ultimate Fighting Championship
Dwyer was expected to make his promotional debut on August 2, 2014 at UFC 176 against Alex Garcia.  However, Dwyer pulled out of the bout citing injury and was replaced by Neil Magny.  Subsequently, after UFC 176 was cancelled, Magny/Garcia was rescheduled and eventually took place on August 23, 2014 at UFC Fight Night 49.

Dwyer eventually made his debut on October 4, 2014 at UFC Fight Night 54 where he faced Albert Tumenov.  Dwyer lost the fight knockout in the first round.

Dwyer faced William Macário on February 22, 2015 at UFC Fight Night 61.  Dwyer won the fight via knockout in the first round. Subsequently, Dwyer earned a Performance of the Night bonus.

Dwyer faced Alan Jouban on July 15, 2015 at UFC Fight Night 71. He lost the back and forth fight by unanimous decision.  Both participants were awarded Fight of the Night honors.

Dwyer face promotional newcomer Randy Brown on January 30, 2016, at UFC on Fox 18. He lost the fight via unanimous decision and was subsequently released from the promotion.

Post-UFC career

After being released from the promotion Dwyer would return to the Canadian regional scene winning three straight including victories over UFC veteran's Jesse Ronson and Dominique Steele. During this period however Dwyer would have 3 fights cancelled causing a period of inactivity from mid 2016-late 2017

He would briefly be paired against Joe Riggs for the main event of Fight Night 9: Lethbridge for the vacant Middleweight title on January 21, 2019. However the bout was canceled due to injury for Riggs. He would be replaced by Chris Curtis, Dwyer would go on to lose the fight via majority decision.

Dwyer next faced KB Bhullar at Unified MMA 38 for the Middleweight title on September 27, 2019. He would lose the fight via unanimous decision.

Travelling to Russia for his next bout, he faced Mikhail Ragozin at RCC 7 on December 14, 2019. Dwyer would lose the fight via unanimous decision.

Returning to action amidst the Covid-19 pandemic, he faced UFC veteran and Ultimate Fighter winner Elias Theodorou at Rise FC 6 on March 13, 2021. He would lose the fight via technical knockout in the third round.

Dwyer faced Christophe Van Dijk on December 1, 2022 at BFL 74, losing the bout via knockout due to a knee and punches in the second round.

Championships and accomplishments
Battlefield Fight League
Battlefield Fight League Welterweight Championship (one time; former)
One successful title defense
Battlefield Fight League Middleweight Championship (one time; former)
Ultimate Fighting Championship
Performance of the Night (One time) vs. William Macário
Fight of the Night (One time) vs. Alan Jouban

Mixed martial arts record

|-
|Loss
|align=center|11–9
|Christophe Van Dijk
|KO (knee and punches)
|BFL 75
|
|align=center|2
|align=center|4:28
|Vancouver, British Columbia, Canada
|
|-
|Loss
|align=center|11–8
|Elias Theodorou
|TKO (punches)
|Rise FC 6: Fighting the Stigma
|
|align=center|3
|align=center|1:20
|Victoria, British Columbia, Canada
|
|-
|Loss
|align=center|11–7
|Mikhail Ragozin
|Decision (unanimous)
|RCC 7
|
|align=center|3
|align=center|5:00
|Yekaterinburg, Russia
|
|-
|Loss
|align=center|11–6
|KB Bhullar
|Decision (unanimous)
|Unified MMA 38
|
|align=center|5
|align=center|5:00
|Edmonton, Alberta, Canada
|For the Unified MMA Middleweight Championship.
|-
|Loss
|align=center|11–5
|Chris Curtis
|Decision (majority)
|Z Promotions Fight Night 9: Lethbridge
|
|align=center|5
|align=center|5:00
|Lethbridge, Alberta, Canada
|For the vacant ZP Middleweight Championship.
|-
|Win
|align=center|11–4
|Dominique Steele
|KO (punch)
|XXFC 18: Diablo Fight Series 
|
|align=center|1
|align=center|4:59
|British Columbia, Canada
|Won the vacant XFFC Middleweight Championship.
|-
|Win
|align=center|10–4
|Chris Anderson
|Decision (split)
|BFL 53
|
|align=center|5
|align=center|5:00
|British Columbia, Canada
|Middleweight debut; won BFL Middleweight Championship.
|-
|Win
|align=center|9–4
|Jesse Ronson
|Decision (unanimous)
|XFFC 10: Out of the Ashes
|
|align=center|3
|align=center|5:00
|Grande Prairie, Alberta, Canada
|
|-
|Loss
|align=center|8–4
| Randy Brown 
|Decision (unanimous)
|UFC on Fox: Johnson vs. Bader
|
|align=center|3
|align=center|5:00
|Newark, New Jersey, United States
|
|-
|Loss
| align=center| 8–3
|Alan Jouban
| Decision (unanimous)
|UFC Fight Night: Mir vs. Duffee
|
|align=center| 3
|align=center| 5:00
|San Diego, California, United States
|
|-
| Win
|align=center| 8–2
|William Macário
| KO (superman punch)
|UFC Fight Night: Bigfoot vs. Mir
|
|align=center|1
|align=center|3:14
|Porto Alegre, Brazil
|
|-
| Loss
|align=center| 7–2
|Albert Tumenov
| KO (head kick and punch)
|UFC Fight Night: MacDonald vs. Saffiedine
|
|align=center|1
|align=center|1:03
|Halifax, Nova Scotia, Canada
|
|-
| Win
|align=center| 7–1
|DaMarques Johnson
| TKO (punches) 
|BFL 30
|
|align=center|2
|align=center|3:39
|Richmond, British Columbia, Canada
|
|-
| Win
|align=center| 6–1
|Shonie Carter
| TKO (retirement)
|BFL 27
|
|align=center|3
|align=center|5:00
|Richmond, British Columbia, Canada
|
|-
| Win
|align=center| 5–1
|Colin Daynes
| TKO (punches)
|BFL 24
|
|align=center|1
|align=center|4:33
|Penticton, British Columbia, Canada
|
|-
| Win
|align=center| 4–1
|Ryan Chiappe
| TKO (punches)
|BFL 19
|
|align=center|1
|align=center|4:37
|Penticton, British Columbia, Canada
|
|-
| Win
|align=center| 3–1
|Levi Alford
| KO (punch)
|BFL 17
|
|align=center|1
|align=center|0:29
|Penticton, British Columbia, Canada
|
|-
| Loss
|align=center| 2–1
|Marcus Aurelio
| KO (slam)
|BFL 15
|
|align=center|1
|align=center|0:30
|Nanaimo, British Columbia, Canada
|
|-
| Win
|align=center| 2–0
|Mark Doble
| TKO (punches and elbows)
|BFL 13
|
|align=center|1
|align=center|3:31
|Vernon, British Columbia, Canada
|
|-
| Win
|align=center| 1–0
|Levi Alford
| KO (knee)
|BFL 10
|
|align=center|1
|align=center|0:41
|Vernon, British Columbia, Canada
|
|-

See also
 List of current UFC fighters
 List of male mixed martial artists
 List of Canadian UFC fighters

References

External links

Living people
1989 births
Canadian practitioners of Brazilian jiu-jitsu
Canadian male mixed martial artists
Sportspeople from New Westminster
Middleweight mixed martial artists
Welterweight mixed martial artists
Mixed martial artists utilizing Brazilian jiu-jitsu
Ultimate Fighting Championship male fighters